The 1996 Patriot League men's basketball tournament was played at Hart Center in Worcester, Massachusetts and Cotterell Court in Hamilton, New York after the conclusion of the 1995–96 regular season.  defeated #3 seed , 74–65 in the championship game, to win its second Patriot League Tournament title. The Raiders earned an automatic bid to the 1996 NCAA tournament as #16 seed in the Southeast region.

Format
All seven league members participated in the tournament, with teams seeded according to regular season conference record. Play began with the quarterfinal round. The top seed, Colgate, received a bye to the semifinal round.

Bracket

* denotes overtime period

References

Tournament
Patriot League men's basketball tournament
Patriot League men's basketball tournament
Patriot League men's basketball tournament
Patriot League men's basketball tournament